The New York Mets are an American professional baseball team based in the New York City borough of Queens. The Mets compete in Major League Baseball (MLB) as a member of the National League (NL) East division. They are one of two major league clubs based in New York City, the other being the American League's (AL) New York Yankees. One of baseball's first expansion teams, the Mets were founded in 1962 to replace New York's departed NL teams, the Brooklyn Dodgers and the New York Giants. The team's colors evoke the blue of the Dodgers and the orange of the Giants.

For the 1962 and 1963 seasons, the Mets played home games at the Polo Grounds in Manhattan before moving to Queens. From 1964 to 2008, the Mets played their home games at Shea Stadium, named after William Shea, the founder of the Continental League, a proposed third major league, the announcement of which prompted their admission as an NL expansion team. Since 2009, the Mets have played their home games at Citi Field next to the site where Shea Stadium once stood.

In their inaugural season, the Mets posted a record of 40–120, the worst regular-season record since MLB went to a 162-game schedule. The team never finished better than second-to-last in the 1960s until the "Miracle Mets" beat the Baltimore Orioles in the 1969 World Series, considered one of the biggest upsets in World Series history despite the Mets having won 100 games that season. The Mets have qualified for the postseason ten times, winning the World Series twice (1969 and 1986) and winning five National League pennants (most recently in 2000 and 2015), and six National League East division titles.

Since 2020, the Mets have been owned by billionaire hedge fund manager Steve Cohen, who purchased the team for $2.4 billion. As of 2022, Forbes ranked the Mets as the sixth most valuable MLB team, valued at $2.650 billion.

As of the end of the 2022 regular season, the team's overall win–loss record is 4,652–4,988.

Franchise history

1960s: Founding and first World Series
After the 1957 season, the Brooklyn Dodgers and New York Giants relocated from New York to California to become the Los Angeles Dodgers and San Francisco Giants, leaving the largest city in the United States with no National League franchise and only one major league team, the New York Yankees of the American League (AL). With the threat of a New York team joining a new third league, the National League expanded by adding the New York Mets following a proposal from William Shea. In a symbolic reference to New York's earlier National League teams, the new team took as its primary colors the blue of the Dodgers and the orange of the Giants, both of which are colors also featured on the Flag of New York City. The nickname "Mets" was adopted: being a natural shorthand to the club's corporate name, the "New York Metropolitan Baseball Club, Inc.", which hearkened back to the "Metropolitans" (a New York team in the American Association from 1880 to 1887), and its brevity was advantageous for newspaper headlines.

The 1962 Mets posted a 40–120 record, a major league record for the most losses in a season since 1899. During the 1963 season the team featured a pitcher, Carlton Willey, who was having a great year, pitching four shut-outs, when he incurred an injury and finished with a 9–14 win–loss record. The '63 squad also had Duke Snider, who hit his 2,000th hit and later his 400th home run and earned a berth to the 1963 All-Star Game. In 1964, the Mets hired Yogi Berra as a coach under Casey Stengel's coaching staff.

In 1966, the Mets famously bypassed future Hall of Famer Reggie Jackson in the amateur draft, instead selecting Steve Chilcott, who never played in the majors. But the following year, they acquired future Hall of Famer Tom Seaver in a lottery. Seaver helped the 1969 "Miracle Mets" win the new National League East division title, then defeat the Atlanta Braves to win the National League pennant and the heavily favored Baltimore Orioles to win the 1969 World Series.

1970s: Second pennant and the "Midnight Massacre"
In 1973, the Mets rallied from 5th place to win the division, despite a record of only 82–79. They shocked the heavily favored Cincinnati Reds' "Big Red Machine" in the NLCS and pushed the defending World Series champion Oakland Athletics to a seventh game, but lost the series. Notably, 1973 was the only NL East title between 1970 and 1980 that was not won by either the Philadelphia Phillies or the Pittsburgh Pirates. Star pitcher Tom Seaver was traded in 1977, on a day remembered as "the Midnight Massacre", and the Mets fell into last place for several years.

1980s: Success, Wilpon takes over and second World Series championship

In January 1980, the Payson heirs sold the Mets franchise to the Doubleday publishing company for $21.1 million, a record amount at that time. Nelson Doubleday, Jr. was named chairman of the board while minority shareholder Fred Wilpon took the role of club president. In February, Wilpon hired longtime Baltimore Orioles executive Frank Cashen as general manager who began the process of rebuilding the Mets much in the same way he developed the Orioles in the late 1960s and early 1970s.

The franchise turned around in the mid-1980s. During this time the Mets drafted slugger Darryl Strawberry (#1 in 1980) and 1985 Cy Young Award winner Dwight Gooden (#5 in 1982). Former National League MVP and perennial Gold Glove winner Keith Hernandez was obtained by the Mets in 1983. After finishing their first three campaigns of the 1980s decade in either 5th or 6th (last) place, in 1984, new manager Davey Johnson was promoted from the helm of the AAA Tidewater Tides. He led the Mets to a second-place, 90–72 record, their first winning season since 1976.

In 1985, they acquired Hall of Fame catcher Gary Carter from the Montreal Expos and won 98 games, but narrowly missed the playoffs. In 1986, they won the division with a record of 108–54, one of the best in National League history. They then won a dramatic NLCS in six games over the Houston Astros.
The sixth game of the series lasted sixteen innings, the longest playoff game in history until 2005. The Mets came within one strike of losing the World Series against the Boston Red Sox before a series of hits and defensive miscues ultimately led to an error by Boston's Bill Buckner which gave the Mets a Game 6 victory. The Mets won their second World Series title in seven games.

In 1987 the Mets declined to re-sign World Series MVP Ray Knight, who then signed with the Baltimore Orioles and also traded away the flexible Kevin Mitchell to the Padres for long-ball threat Kevin McReynolds. Weeks later Mets' ace Dwight Gooden was admitted to a drug clinic after testing positive for cocaine. Despite Gooden struggling in the first few months of the 1987 season, "Dr. K" rebounded, as did the team. It was during the tough times that the Mets made a great long-term deal, trading Ed Hearn to the Kansas City Royals for pitcher David Cone.

They surged to battle St. Louis for the division title. They suffered two painful losses to the Cardinals. The first came on Seat Cushion Night where Tom Herr hit a walk-off grand slam. A greater loss came on September 11 in a game against St. Louis, 3rd baseman Terry Pendleton hit a homer to give the Cardinals a lead, and eventually the NL East title. One highlight of the year was Darryl Strawberry and Howard Johnson becoming the first teammates' ever to hit 30 homers and steal 30 bases in the same season. After posting a 100–60 overall record, the Mets won the division in 1988, but lost in the NLCS that year and declined into the 1990s.

1990s: Struggles and return to the postseason
The Mets struggled for much of the 1990s, finishing with a losing record for six consecutive seasons between 1991 and 1996. The Mets would not return to the postseason until 1999 after a one-game playoff against the Cincinnati Reds. Despite victory against the Arizona Diamondbacks in the 1999 National League Division Series, the Mets were defeated by their NL East rivals, the Atlanta Braves, in the 1999 National League Championship Series in six games.

2000s: The Subway World Series and new ballpark
In 2000, the Mets finished the season with a 94–68 record and  clinched a wild card spot in the playoffs. In the NLDS, the Mets defeated the San Francisco Giants 3–1 in the series and the St Louis Cardinals in the NLCS. After winning the National League pennant, the Mets earned a trip to the 2000 World Series against their crosstown rivals, the New York Yankees, for a "Subway Series". The Mets were defeated by the Yankees in five games. The most memorable moment of the 2000 World Series occurred during the first inning of Game 2 at Yankee Stadium. Piazza fouled off a pitch which shattered his bat, sending a piece of the barrel toward the pitcher's mound. Pitcher Roger Clemens seized the piece and hurled it in the direction of Piazza as the catcher trotted to first base, benches briefly cleared before the game was resumed with no ejections.

During the 2001 season, the Mets finished with a record of 82–80 finishing third in the division. After the September 11 terrorist attacks Shea Stadium was used as a relief center and then saw the first sporting event in New York City since the attacks, in a game vs. the Atlanta Braves on September 21. In the bottom of the 8th inning the Mets were trailing 2–1 when Mike Piazza came to bat with a runner on first. Piazza dramatically sent Shea into a frenzy by crushing a home run to give the Mets a 3–2 lead and the eventual win. The game is considered to be one of the greatest moments in the history of the franchise.

In 2002, despite the off-season signings of Tom Glavine, Mo Vaughn, and Roberto Alomar, the Mets finished the 2002 season with a 75-86 overall record and last in the NL East. During that same season the Mets dealt with off field distractions when co-owners Wilpon and Doubleday were in a legal battle which was later settled with Wilpon becoming the sole owner on August 23 that year.

The Mets nearly missed the playoffs in 2001 and struggled from 2002 to 2004. In the aftermath of the 2004 season, the Mets hired a new general manager, Omar Minaya, who immediately turned the franchise around by signing pitcher Pedro Martínez and hiring a new manager, Willie Randolph. The Mets finished 2005 four games over .500, and the franchise's resurgence was complete by 2006 as they won 97 games and the NL East title behind new acquisitions Carlos Beltrán and Carlos Delgado, as well as young superstars José Reyes and David Wright. The Mets eventually succumbed to the St. Louis Cardinals in Game 7 of the National League Championship Series.

In 2007, the Mets entered the final 17 games in the season with a seven-game lead in the NL East. But the team went on an ill-timed losing streak, losing 11 of the next 15 games, resulting in the Philadelphia Phillies winning the division by one game.

The Mets held a more modest 3.5-game lead after 145 games of the 2008 season, their final season at Shea Stadium. On June 16, Omar Minaya fired Willie Randolph, Rick Peterson, and Tom Nieto. Jerry Manuel was named interim manager. While their 7–10 mark down the stretch was better than the previous season's 5–12, it still allowed the Phillies to pass them once again for the division crown.

In 2009, the Mets moved into the newly constructed Citi Field. On April 17, Gary Sheffield, who just days earlier was signed by the Mets as a free agent, hit his 500th home run against the Milwaukee Brewers. Sheffield became the first pinch hitter to reach this milestone, as well as the first to do it in a Mets uniform. The season was mainly a tough one for the Mets which was marred by numerous injuries suffered by its players, with 20 of them having been on the disabled list at one point or another during the season and losing star (and also replacement) players like J. J. Putz, John Maine, Óliver Pérez, José Reyes, Carlos Beltrán, David Wright, Carlos Delgado, Johan Santana, and Gary Sheffield.

As a result, the Mets finished in fourth place, with a record of 70–92 and failed to qualify for the playoffs for the third straight season. Mets players spent more than 1,480 days in the disabled list in 2009, more than any other team in the majors. Second-half turnarounds of Jeff Francoeur and Daniel Murphy helped the Mets finish the season with the best batting average in the National League, tied with the Los Angeles Dodgers.

2010s: Wilpon sells the team and Fifth trip to the World Series
In 2012, Mets owners Fred Wilpon and Saul Katz settled a lawsuit brought against them on behalf of the victims of Bernard Madoff's Ponzi scheme for $162 million. As a result of this agreement the liquidator, Irving Picard, agreed to drop the charges that Wilpon and Katz blindly went along with the scheme for their personal benefit. Picard had originally sought to recover $1 billion from the Wilpon family and Katz, but settled for $162 million along with the admission that neither the Wilpons nor Katz had any knowledge of the Ponzi scheme. In 2011–2012, Mets ownership sold twelve minority 4% shares (totaling 48%) of the franchise at $20 million apiece to provide a cash infusion of $240 million for the team.

Though the first half of the 2010s saw limited success for the Mets, who failed to finish with a winning record between 2009 and 2014, this period coincided with a number of milestones for the franchise, including the first no-hitter in franchise history by Johan Santana in 2012. R.A. Dickey won the NL Cy Young Award pitching for the Mets that same season.

On September 26, 2015, the Mets clinched the NL East division title, and thus their first postseason berth since 2006, by defeating the Cincinnati Reds 10–2. They defeated the Los Angeles Dodgers in the NLDS, three games to two, and swept the Chicago Cubs in the NLCS for their first pennant in 15 years. In the 2015 World Series, they were defeated by the Kansas City Royals in five games.

The Mets returned to the postseason in 2016, marking only the second time in franchise history that the team qualified for the postseason in consecutive years. With an 87–75 record, the team qualified for the wild-card game, only to lose 3–0 to the San Francisco Giants. The Mets failed to make the playoffs for the rest of the decade, finishing no higher than third place in 2019 when they finished with a winning record of 86–76 (the highest of any team not to qualify for the postseason).

The end of the decade also coincided with David Wright's retirement, Jacob deGrom being awarded two consecutive Cy Young Awards (including for the 2018 season when the pitcher finished the year with a 1.70 ERA) and first-baseman Pete Alonso winning the 2019 Rookie of the Year Award and finishing the season with a major-league-leading 53 home runs, the most by any rookie in MLB history. On October 3, 2019, the Mets fired manager Mickey Callaway. On November 1, 2019, the Mets named Carlos Beltrán as the new manager replacing Callaway.

2020s: Steve Cohen Era
On January 16, 2020, Beltrán stepped down as manager before the start of the 2020 season due to his involvement in the Houston Astros sign stealing scandal. Two days later, the Mets hired Luis Rojas as manager. The team finished the shortened 2020 season with a 26–34 record and a last-place finish in the NL East.

On October 30, 2020, Steve Cohen became the majority owner of the Mets, owning 95% of the team, making him the current richest owner in baseball. He bought the team from the Wilpon family for $2.475 billion, with the Wilpons keeping the remaining 5%. On January 7, 2021, the Mets acquired pitcher Carlos Carrasco and all-star shortstop Francisco Lindor in a trade with the Cleveland Indians. On April 1, 2021, Lindor and the Mets agreed to an extension worth $341 million for the next 11 years. At the trade deadline, the Mets acquired All-star infielder & world series champion Javier Báez in trade with the Chicago Cubs. The Mets finished third place in the NL East with an overall record of 77–85.

On November 19, 2021, the Mets hired Billy Eppler as the new general manager. During the 2021–2022 off-season, the Mets signed free agents Nick Plummer, Starling Marte, Eduardo Escobar, and Mark Canha. On December 1, the Mets signed three-time Cy Young Award winner Max Scherzer with a three-year $130 million deal. On December 18, the Mets announced hiring Buck Showalter as their manager via owner Steve Cohen's Twitter account. On April 29, 2022, Tylor Megill, Drew Smith, Joely Rodríguez, Seth Lugo and Edwin Díaz pitched the second no-hitter in franchise history. At the trade deadline, the Mets added 1B/DH Daniel Vogelbach from the Pirates, OF Tyler Naquin from the Reds, and OF Darin Ruf from the Giants. On September 19, 2022 Jacob deGrom set a new MLB record by allowing three or less earned runs. On September 25, 2022 Pete Alonso broke the Mets single season RBI record which was previously set by former franchise stars Mike Piazza and David Wright. Also during the season, the Mets called up three of their top prospects Brett Baty, Mark Vientos, and Francisco Álvarez.

World Series championships

Throughout the 60-year history of the franchise, the Mets have won 2 World Series Championships in total.

Culture

Fan support
In 1998, the Independent Budget Office of the city of New York published a study on the economic effect of the city's two Major League Baseball teams. The study found that 43% of Mets fans lived in one of the five boroughs of New York, 39% in the tri-state area outside the city, and 12% elsewhere. Mets fans were more likely to be found in Queens, Brooklyn, and the Long Island counties of Nassau and Suffolk. Mets, Yankees, and Toronto Blue Jays fans are shared in Western New York. Notable fans of the Mets include Jerry Seinfeld, Kevin James, Julia Stiles, Ty Burrell, Bill Maher, Ben Stiller, Jimmy Kimmel, Hank Azaria, Jim Breuer,  Jon Stewart, Chris Rock, Matthew Broderick, Dylan O'Brien, Glenn Close, Billy Joel, Ad-Rock, MCA,  Nas, 50 Cent, Nicki Minaj, Chris Christie, Patrick Mahomes, and Donovan Mitchell.

The 7 Line Army

The "7 Line Army" are a group primarily consisting of passionate and die-hard Mets fans occupying the Big Apple Section of Citi Field during home games for the Mets. The group was founded in 2012 by Darren Meenan who owns The 7 Line, an apparel company that produces Mets-themed clothing.

Mascots
 

Mr. Met is the official mascot of the New York Mets. He was introduced on the cover of game programs in 1963, when the Mets were still playing at the Polo Grounds in northern Manhattan. When the Mets moved to Shea Stadium in 1964, fans were introduced to a live costumed version. Mr. Met is believed to have been the first mascot in Major League Baseball to exist in human (as opposed to artistically rendered) form.

Mrs. Met (formerly Lady Met) is the female counterpart to Mr. Met, and the couple sometimes appears with 2–3 smaller "children".

The Mets have had two mascots other than Mr. and Mrs. Met at different points in its history. The franchise's original official mascot was Homer, a beagle trained by Rudd Weatherwax that lived at the Waldorf-Astoria, was sponsored by Rheingold Beer and had his own platform behind home plate at the Polo Grounds. The dog was not included in the ballclub's transition to Shea Stadium. The brainchild of team owner Lorinda de Roulet's daughter Bebe, Mettle the mule represented the Mets for only the 1979 season. The name was the result of a contest won by Dolores Mapps of Mercerville, New Jersey whose explanation was that it typified the team's "spirit, ardor, stamina and courage, all of which the Mets have in abundance." Mettle was not retained after the franchise was sold to Nelson Doubleday Jr. and Fred Wilpon the following year.

Theme song
"Meet the Mets" is the Mets' signature song, written in 1961, one year before the first season, by Bill Katz and Ruth Roberts. It is played on the radio, during television broadcasts and at Mets' home games. Other songs traditionally sung at Mets home games include "Take Me Out to the Ball Game" and the Sicilian song "C'è la luna mezzo mare" during the seventh-inning stretch and Billy Joel's "Piano Man" in the middle of the eighth inning.

Uniform and logo symbolism

The Mets' colors are blue and orange, originally chosen to honor the city's history of National League baseball; blue for the Brooklyn Dodgers, and orange for the New York Giants. Blue and orange are also the colors of New York City, as seen on its flag.

In 1998, black was added to the color scheme, although beginning with 2012 the black elements in the uniform began to be phased out, and were eliminated in 2013.

Logo
The primary logo, designed by sports cartoonist Ray Gotto, consists of "Mets" written in orange script trimmed in white across a blue representation of the New York City skyline with a white suspension bridge in the foreground, all contained in an orange circle with orange baseball stitching across the image. Each part of the skyline has special meaning—at the left is a church spire, symbolic of Brooklyn, the borough of churches; the second building from the left is the Williamsburgh Savings Bank Building, the tallest building in Brooklyn at the time of the team's founding; next is the Woolworth Building; after a general skyline view of midtown comes the Empire State Building; at the far right is the headquarters of the United Nations. The suspension bridge in the center symbolizes that the Mets, by bringing National League baseball back to New York, represent all five boroughs; many of New York's major bridges are suspension designs. In 1999, the logo received a slight alteration; a small "NY" originally placed to the left of the team script was removed. No other notable changes have ever been made to the logo.

The cap logo consists of an orange, interlocking "NY" identical to the logo used by the New York Giants in their final years, and is on a blue cap reminiscent of the caps worn by the Brooklyn Dodgers.

With the introduction of black as an official color, an alternate team logo was created in 1999. It is identical to the original logo, but the skyline is black instead of blue and the "Mets" script is blue trimmed in orange and white instead of orange trimmed in white (the alternate black jerseys displayed the primary blue and orange logo on the left sleeves in 1998; in 1999 this was changed to the alternate black and blue logo). The logo fell into disuse after the Mets dropped the alternate black jerseys and caps in 2012. In 2021, alternate black jerseys returned.

Uniform color and design
Currently, the Mets wear an assortment of uniforms.

The home uniforms are white with blue pinstripes and feature "Mets" in blue script with an orange outline across the chest, and block letter player names and numbers also in blue with an orange outline. The uniforms are paired with a blue cap featuring an "NY" logo in orange, plus blue undersleeves, belts and socks.

The gray road jerseys feature a radially-arched "NEW YORK" in Tiffany-style letters across the chest, block letter player numerals and names in blue outlined in orange, and blue placket and sleeve piping. Like the home uniforms, the road grays are worn with the same blue caps, undersleeves, belts and socks.

The blue alternate uniform, introduced in 2012, features the "Mets" script and block lettering and numbers in orange with white outline, and orange piping. The blue alternates are worn with a secondary blue cap featuring the "NY" logo in orange trimmed in white.

The black alternate uniform, introduced in its current form in 2022, is a modified version of the uniform worn from 1998 to 2012 and reintroduced for Friday home games in 2021. The lettering is blue with white trim and orange drop shadows, lacked the blue piping of the previous iteration, and has the primary logo (sans black) on the left sleeve. The set is worn with an alternate black cap featuring the "NY" logo in blue trimmed in white with orange drop shadows. Belts and socks worn with it are also black. Both the blue and black alternate uniforms are worn with plain white pants with blue piping.

The Mets' standard blue batting helmet, with the "NY" in metallic orange, is currently used for games worn with the primary home, road and blue alternate jerseys. A black alternate helmet is used in games with the black jerseys.

Players of note

Team captains
 

Four players have been team captains for the Mets:
 Keith Hernandez 1987–1989 (co-captain with Gary Carter)
 Gary Carter 1988–1989 (co-captain with Keith Hernandez)
 John Franco 2001–2004
 David Wright 2013–2018

Baseball Hall of Famers

Retired numbers

The Mets have retired eight numbers in the history of the franchise.

Major League Baseball retired Jackie Robinson's number 42 on April 15, 1997, when the Mets played the Dodgers at Shea Stadium. Butch Huskey wore the number throughout the rest of his Mets career because of a grandfather clause placed on the retired number by MLB. Mo Vaughn also wore 42 during his stint with the Mets, because of the same clause.

On the final opening day at Shea Stadium, April 8, 2008, the Mets unveiled a sign bearing the name "Shea" next to the team's retired numbers honoring William Shea and his contributions to the franchise.

In 2014, a special memorial logo honoring broadcaster Ralph Kiner, depicting a microphone along with his name and the years 1922–2014, was displayed on the left-field wall adjacent to, but not as a part of, the Mets' retired numbers, from 2014 to 2016. In the 2016 Mets yearbook, a sidebar in an article on Mike Piazza's upcoming number retirement implies that Kiner has been "retired" a la William A. Shea. This was confirmed when the Mets' retired numbers were moved to the roof facade during the 2016 season to accommodate Mike Piazza's number 31; the Kiner logo was placed next to the Shea and Jackie Robinson numbers, no longer separated from the others. On August 28, 2021, Jerry Koosman's No.36 was retired by the Mets. On July 9, 2022, the Mets retired Keith Hernandez's  number 17. They retired number 24 worn by Willie Mays on August 27, 2022.

Numbers out of circulation but not retired
 5: Not issued since the retirement of David Wright.
 8: Not issued since Gary Carter was elected to the Hall of Fame in 2003 (as an Expo after requesting to go in as a Met). When the Mets honored Carter, they did not retire number 8, but instead gave him a replica of his Hall of Fame plaque depicting him as a Met instead of an Expo. Desi Relaford was the last Mets player to wear No. 8; Matt Galante, a coach, later wore the number. After Carter's death, the Mets honored him in a ceremony on Opening Day 2012, where they unveiled the "Kid 8" memorial logo (also worn on the uniform sleeve) on the outfield fence. However, the number 8 is still not officially retired.

Mets Hall of Fame

Rivalries

Subway Series

The Mets – New York Yankees rivalry is the latest incarnation of the Subway Series, the competition between New York City's teams, the American League New York Yankees and the National League Mets. Until Interleague play started, the two teams had only met in exhibition games. Since the inception of interleague play the two teams have met every regular season since 1997, and since 1999 they have met six times each season, playing two three-game series, one in each team's ballpark. From the 2013 season however the number of games was reduced to four, two at each ballpark with the Mets winning six of the last eight games in that span. They have made the postseason in the same year four times: 1999, 2000, 2006, and 2015, and faced off in the 2000 World Series.

Atlanta Braves

The Braves–Mets rivalry is a rivalry between two teams in the National League East, featuring the Atlanta Braves and the Mets.

Although their first major confrontation occurred when the Mets swept the Braves in the 1969 NLCS, en route to their first World Series championship, the first playoff series won by an expansion team (also the first playoff appearance by an expansion team), the rivalry did not become especially heated until the 1990s, when a division realignment in 1994 put the Mets and the Braves in the NL East together (from 1969 to 1993, the Braves were in the NL West). The two teams faced each other again in the 1999 NLCS, and the Braves won the series four games to two. However, they would go on to lose to the Yankees in the 1999 World Series.

Philadelphia Phillies

The rivalry between the Mets and the Philadelphia Phillies from 2006 to 2008 was said to be among the "hottest" rivalries in the National League.

Aside from several brawls in the 1980s, the rivalry remained low-key before the 2006 season, as the teams had seldom been equally good at the same time. Since 2006, the teams have battled for playoff position. The Mets won the division in 2006 and contended in 2007 and 2008, while the Phillies won five consecutive division titles from 2007 to 2011. The Phillies' 2007 Eastern Division Title was won on the last day of the season as the Mets lost a seven-game lead with 17 games remaining while losing 12 of 18 games that season to the Phillies, including being swept at home in the first 3 games of the remaining 17, dropping their lead from 7 games to 3.5.

Staff

Roster

New York Mets Foundation
A registered 501(c)(3) charity, the New York Mets Foundation is the philanthropic organization of the New York Mets. Founded in 1963, it funds and promotes charitable causes in the Mets community. One of these causes is Tuesday's Children, is a non-profit family service organization that "has made a long term commitment to meet the needs of every family who lost a loved one in the terrorist attacks on September 11, 2001". The Mets host the annual Welcome Home Dinner, which raised over $550,000 for the Mets Foundation in 2012. All proceeds were distributed to Katz Institute for Women's Health and Katz Women's Hospitals of North Shore-LIJ Health System and The Leukemia & Lymphoma Society.

Owners and executives

New York Mets broadcasters

Television
Most Mets games are carried by SportsNet New York (SNY), a joint venture of the Mets and NBC Sports Regional Networks. The team's terrestrial broadcast home is WPIX, where the team has broadcast games since 1999.

Longtime Mets radio announcer Gary Cohen does the play-by-play, having moved to television with the launch of SNY in 2006. Former Mets Keith Hernandez and Ron Darling are the color commentators with Steve Gelbs being the on-the-field reporter.

In early January 2016, Keith Hernandez re-signed with SNY. Reports indicate that Hernandez received a raise and three-year contract.

Radio
Since 2019, Mets games have been broadcast on WCBS-AM 880. Howie Rose is the main play-by-play announcer; Wayne Randazzo, who previously hosted the pre- and post-game shows, is Rose's partner. Longtime Mets beat reporter Ed Coleman took over the pre- and post-game role for most games. Starting in the 2023 Season, Randazzo will be replaced by Keith Raad as Randazzo will be doing the television broadcasts for the Los Angeles Angels.

The Mets' previous radio flagship was WOR-AM from 2014 to 2018. The Mets were previously carried by WFAN-AM, which inherited the team's broadcast rights from WHN when it took over its frequency in 1987, and in later years by WFAN-FM which simulcasts the AM signal.

Spanish-language broadcasts are carried by WEPN 1050 AM featuring Juan Alicea and Max Perez-Jimenez. It was formerly broadcast on WQBU-FM 92.7, Que Buena from 2020 to 2021. Both English and Spanish broadcasts are also aired on the Audacy internet radio service.

Rose, who has spent much of his career covering the Mets, replaced Bob Murphy as Gary Cohen's broadcast partner in 2004 following Murphy's retirement. Cohen then left the radio booth for the SNY television booth in 2006 and was replaced by Tom McCarthy, who departed after two seasons and was replaced by Wayne Hagin. Josh Lewin joined the broadcast after the team parted ways with Hagin following the 2011 season; he departed when broadcasts moved to WCBS.

Coinciding with the move to WCBS, the Mets, abruptly and without public announcement (other than a brief e-mail to its affiliates days before the season began), stopped syndicating its games to other stations outside the New York City area, shutting down the New York Mets Radio Network.

Minor league affiliations

The New York Mets farm system consists of seven minor league affiliates.

See also
List of New York Mets managers
List of New York Mets owners and executives
List of New York Mets seasons
List of World Series champions
New York Mets award winners and league leaders

Bibliography

References

External links

 
 History of the New York Mets
 New York Mets Team Index
 Ultimate Mets Database

 
Major League Baseball teams
Grapefruit League
Baseball teams established in 1962
Sports teams in New York City
1962 establishments in New York (state)
1962 establishments in New York City
Baseball teams in New York City